Zoo Outreach Organisation (ZOO), India started off as an NGO primarily focusing on training zoo staff and bettering the circumstances of captive animals in Indian zoos. It has since evolved into an overall nature and wildlife conservation NGO, and is an affiliate member of the World Association of Zoos and Aquariums (WAZA).

Wildlife Information Liaison Development, ZOO's sister organization, publishes the Journal of Threatened Taxa; ZOO hosts the journal's website.

See also
 List of zoo associations

Notes

References
 Downloads: ZOO CAMP and PHVA Reports from “Zoo Outreach Organisation”, India
 Back Issues: "ZOOS PRINT magazine" of  "Zoo Outreach Organisation”, India
 Official website of: "Central Zoo Authority of India" (CZA), Government of India
 “Zoo Outreach Organisation”, ZOO
 Zoo Outreach Organisation Websites; Listed at the IUCN/Conservation Breeding Specialist Group (CBSG) website. Also see CBSG South Asia - Sally Walker, Convenor CBSG; Zoo Outreach Organisation

External links

 "ZOOS PRINT magazine" of  "Zoo Outreach Organisation”, India

 
Zoo associations
Nature conservation in India
1985 establishments in India